Shirley Margaret McKerrow OAM (née Gardini; born 18 September 1933) was the first woman to serve as federal president of an Australian political party, as president of the National Party from 1981 to 1987.

McKerrow was born to Dante Gardini and Margaret (Peggy), née Kelly. She attended Genazzano Convent in Kew and Ingergowrie Homecrafts Hostel in Hawthorn before studying at the University of Melbourne. In 1955 she married John Alexander McKerrow, with whom she had four children. She served on the central council of the Country Party from 1972 and was a junior vice-president from 1975 to 1976. In 1976 she became the first woman to serve as state president of an Australian party, becoming president of the Victorian branch of the renamed National Party and serving until 1980. In 1980, McKerrow unsuccessfully contested the preselection for the casual vacancy caused by the resignation of Senator James Webster.

In 1981 McKerrow became federal president of the National Party, again the first woman to hold this position for an Australian party; she held this position until her retirement in 1987. In 2001 she received the Centenary Medal for services to Australian politics, and in 2002 she was awarded the Medal of the Order of Australia.

References

1933 births
Living people
Recipients of the Centenary Medal
Recipients of the Medal of the Order of Australia
National Party of Australia politicians
Politicians from Melbourne
University of Melbourne alumni
People educated at Genazzano FCJ College